Ádám Anderle (February 25, 1943 – November 19, 2016) was a Hungarian historian, hispanist, full (university) professor, professor emeritus of Faculty of Arts, University of Szeged (SZTE). He was active in research of the relationship between Latin America and Hungary for decades. He was fluent in Hungarian and Spanish.

Biography and career
He took M. A. degrees at the Attila József University (JATE), Faculty of Arts in Hungarian and History in 1966.

During his academic years he also learned Spanish language because he was interested in the history of Cuba, Latin America and Spain. Tibor Wittman raised Anderle's interest in the Hispanic world.

Anderle received his dr. univ. (doctor universitatis) degree in 1967.

In 1969 he became an educator and a research fellow in the Department of Medieval Universal History and History of Latin America, at the Faculty of Arts, JATE.

He took candidate (C.Sc.) of History degree in 1977 and was awarded Doctor of Science (D.Sc.) degree in history in 1988.

In 1977, he became an associate professor (docent, reader).

He was appointed to the head of the department, and he acted as a head from 1983 until 1992.

In 1989, he received the title of university (full) professor.

In 1993, he founded the Department of Hispanic Studies, and he headed it until 2008.

From 1997 until 2013, he acted as a subprogram leader of Modern history in the Doctoral School of History at the University of Szeged, and he was a member of the Council of the Doctoral School of History and a VIP member of the doctoral school.

In 2013, the honorific title of professor emeritus was conferred upon him.

He was a notable and respected scientist both in Hungary and around the world and developed significant research and professional relationships.

Anderle lectured as a visiting professor at several universities of Latin America: Santa María University in Caracas, National University of San Marcos in Lima, University of Havana in Cuba, and at the universities of Europe: University of Alcalá in Alcalá de Henares, Spain and University of Göttingen in Germany.

His working papers were issued in both national and international prestigious professional research scientific journals, and 20 books and 200 scientific articles were published.

Committee memberships
 Attila József University (JATE), Faculty of Arts, Deputy dean (1985–1986)  
 JATE, head of the department, Department of Medieval Universal History and History of Latin America (1985−1993)
 Research Group Leader (1982−1992)
 Founding head of the Department of Hispanic Studies (1993−2008)
 University of Szeged (SZTE), Doctoral Council of the university, member (2000-2005)
 SZTE, Habilitation Council of the university, member (2000-2014)
 SZTE, Dean's Council of the Faculty of Arts, member (1998-2015)
 SZTE, Doctoral Council of the Faculty of Arts, member (1996-2001)
 SZTE, Faculty of Arts, Council of the Doctoral School of History, member, Modern history Programme, head (1997-2013)
 AHILA – Association of European Latin Americanist Historians, Hungarian coordinator (1975–83), member of the executive committee (1983–93), president (1987–90), honorary member (2015-2016)
 CEISAL – European Council for Social Research on Latin America, president of the Immigration Section (1990-1995)
 Association of Hungarian Latin Americanist Historians, president (1989-1996)
 Hungarian Historical Society, Board of Directors, member (1990-1995)
 Council of the Regional Centre of the Hungarian Academy of Sciences (SZAB), member, and President of the Philosophy and History Commission (Szeged) (1990–1993, 1996–2000, 2002–2005, 2008–2010)
 Hungarian Scientific Students' Associations (OTDT), president of the Human Section (1996-2003)
 Joint Committee of the Spanish-Hungarian Historians, president (2003-2010)
 OTDT, Board of Directors, member (2003-2015)
 Hungarian Academy of Sciences (HAS), member of the Public Body 
Historia Latinoamericana en Europa. Bulletin of AHILA (Liverpool), editorial board member (1985-1993)
Anuario Mariáteguiano (Lima), international advisory board member 
Acta Histórica. Estudios Latinoamericanos, yearbook editor (1982-1993)
Acta Hispánica, yearbook editor (1996-2008)
Jacobus. Revista de Estudios Jacobeos y Medievales, Valladolid, editorial board member (2003-2008)
Mediterranean World. Journal of Social Sciences (Veszprém, Hungary), editorial committee member (2008-2016)
Fundación José Carlos Mariátegui, Board of Trustees, founding member (Lima) (2009-2016)
Világtörténet (Hungarian journal World History, Institute of History of the Research Centre for the Humanities of the HAS), advisory board member (2008-2016)

Awards and honors
 Premio Extraordinario José Carlos Mariátegui (Casa de las Américas, 1981)
 1997: Orden del Mérito Civil, Commander
 1999: Order of Merit for Distinguished Service (Orden al Mérito por Servicios Distinguidos), Peru
 2008: Orden de Isabel la Católica, Encomienda de Número.
 Széchenyi Professor Scholarship (Ministry of Education of Hungary) (1997-2000)
 Master Teacher Gold Medal (OTDT-HAS, 1999)
 Gyula Juhász Prize (2003)
 Pro Universitate (2008)
 Doctor Honoris Causa Pro Scientia (OTDT, 2011)
 Order of Merit of the Republic of Hungary, Officer's Cross (2013)
 Gold Diploma (SZTE, 2016)

Bibliography 
Berta, Tibor et al. (eds.): Az identitás régi és új koordinátái: tanulmányok Anderle Ádám 65. születésnapjára (Papers on Ádám Anderle's 65th Birthday), Szeged: Faculty of Arts, University of Szeged, Hispanisztika Tanszék Budapest: Palatinus, 2008

Selected works
source:

Papers
A Rajk-per spanyolországi előzményei. Századok,  149:(6) pp. 1327–1361. (2015)
Cuba en la historiografía húngara In: Opatrný Josef (ed.) Ibero-Americana Pragensia Supplementum 35: El Caribe hispanoparlante en las obras de sus historiadores. Konferencia helye, ideje: Csehország, 2013.09.06-2013.09.07. Prága: Karolinum, 2014. pp. 49–59. 
El latinoamericanismo en Hungría. Társszerzőkkel: Fischer Ferenc, Lilón Domingo. ANUARIO AMERICANISTA EUROPEO 8: pp. 157–173. (2010)
Történelmi minták és utak. Esszék Spanyolországról és Latin-Amerikáról. Szeged: Szerzői kiadás, 2009. 213 p. 
Magyar kivándorlás Latin-Amerikába az első világháború előtt. Szerző: Torbágyi Péter; szerk. Anderle Ádám. Szeged; SZTE Történettudományi Doktori Iskola, 2009.
A magyar emigráció Latin-Amerikában. Történelmi vázlat. Külügyi szemle 3: pp. 174–192. (2008)
A magyar forradalom és a hispán világ. In: Anderle Ádám (ed.) A magyar forradalom és a hispán világ, 1956. Szeged: Szegedi Tudományegyetem, Bölcsészettudományi Kar, 2007. pp. 13–19. 
A magyar kérdés. Spanyol követi jelentések Bécsből 1848–1868. Szerk. Anderle Ádám. Szeged: Hispánia Kiadó, 2002. 258 p.
Kutatási Közlemények III. A magyar-katalán kapcsolatok ezer éve. Szeged; Hispánia Kiadó, 2001. 121 p.
Stációk. Erdély – Európa – Latin-Amerika. Tudományos konferencia Wittman Tibor professzor születésének 75. évfordulóján; összeáll. Anderle Ádám, szerk. Anderle Ádám, Nagy Marcel; Hispánia, Szeged, 1999
Tanulmányok a Latin-amerikai magyar emigráció történetéből. Szeged; Hispánia Kiadó, 1999. 93 p. 
Investigaciones sobre América Latina. Informe para la Asamblea General de CEISAL. México, 1999.
Kozári Mónika társszerzővel: Un Húngaro en el México Revolucionario: Kálmán Kánya Ministro del Imperio Austro-Húngaro en México durante la Revolución Mexicana y la Primera Guerra Mundial. Mexico City: EDAMEX, 1999. 220 p.

Books
Latin-Amerika. A függetlenség útjai- Bicentenario, 1810-2010; Anderle, Ádám; (ed.) 2. bőv. kiad.; SZTE, Szeged, 2012
A magyar tudományos diákköri konferenciák története, 1951-2011; összeáll., szerk. Anderle Ádám; Országos Tudományos Diákköri Tanács, Bp., 2011
Latin-Amerika története. Szeged: JATEPress Kiadó, 2010. 179 p. 
La mirada húngara. Ensayos sobre la historia de España y de América Latina Szeged: Szegedi Tudományegyetem, 2010. 217 p. 
A magyar-spanyol kapcsolatok ezer éve. Szeged: Szegedi Egyetemi Kiadó, 2006. 208 p. 
Latin-Amerikai utakon. Szeged: Hispánia Kiadó, 2002. 162 p. 
Spanyolország messzire van? Szeged: Hispánia Kiadó, 2000. 134 pp.
Horváth Gyula társszerzővel: Perón – Che Guevara. Budapest; Pannonica Kiadó, 2000. 342 p.

References

External links 

 

1943 births
Academic staff of the University of Szeged
20th-century Hungarian historians
Recipients of the Order of Isabella the Catholic
2016 deaths
Hispanists
21st-century Hungarian historians